Kreva is a township in the Smarhon District of Grodno Region, Belarus. The first mention dates to the 13th century. The toponym is derived from the name of the Krivichs tribe.

History
The Kreva Castle, constructed of brick, was built by the Grand Duke of Lithuania Gediminas in ethnically Lithuanian lands. After his death in 1341, Kreva became the patrimony of his son and successor, Algirdas. In 1382, the Grand Duke Kęstutis was imprisoned in Kreva during the Lithuanian Civil War and subsequently murdered on the order by his nephew Jogaila.

The ruins of the castle were severely damaged during World War I, as they were near the front lines. They remain extant to the present day.

In 1385, the Union of Krewo (Act of Kreva) was signed in Kreva.

In 1387, following the Christianization of Lithuania, the Grand Duke Jogaila established the first Catholic parish in the Lithuanian pagan lands and built a church which is now known as the Church of St. Mary.

Before World War II, 500 Jews lived in the village. After the German occupation of the town they are kept imprisoned in a ghetto and used as slave labourers in harsh conditions. They are deported in other ghettos in Vilnius and Ashmyany in 1942.

Notable people
 Nathan Mileikowsky, a Zionist rabbi, grandfather of Benjamin Netanyahu, Prime Minister of Israel
 Al Kelly, vaudeville comedian

References

External links
 

Populated places in Grodno Region
Smarhon District
Villages in Belarus
Oshmyansky Uyezd
Wilno Voivodeship (1926–1939)
Holocaust locations in Belarus
Jewish communities destroyed in the Holocaust